Willard and Maple is an international literary magazine published by Champlain College. The magazine has its headquarters in Burlington, Vermont. The name comes from the street corner of the magazine's headquarters.

History
Willard & Maple started life as a Champlain College class in 1994, later being published as a student magazine in 1996. It is currently included in both Poet's Market and Novel & Short Story Writer's Market.

Editorial Board
The editorial board of Willard & Maple is made up of students of Champlain College. Poet in Residence Jim Ellefson is the current head.

See also
 List of literary magazines

References

External links
 

Literary magazines published in the United States
Student magazines published in the United States
Annual magazines published in the United States
Magazines established in 1996
Magazines published in Vermont
1996 establishments in Vermont
Champlain College
Mass media in Burlington, Vermont